2010 Suzhou workers riot was an incident that occurred on January 15, 2010 in Suzhou, People's Republic of China involving workers dissatisfied with the company's treatment of its employees as well as compensation problems.

Background
The event took place at the Taiwan owned "United Win technology" company located at the Suzhou Industrial Park.    The company was built in 1999 as a mainland branch of the Taiwan company Wintek.  The company manufactures screens for devices for Apple Inc., Nokia, Motorola and many other companies.  Apple iPhone screens is an important part of the business.

Incident
For a long time the company had been suffering from poor management of staff, bonus compensation problems and poor catering services.  In 2008 the company wide bonuses were canceled due to the economic down turn.  In 2009 a factory employee provided info to a reporter about being poisoned on the job.  The company switched from the regularly used alcohol to a more toxic and dangerous ethane solvent.  In September 2009 some employees came in contact with the chemicals.

Also, according to a report of the 83 suppliers in China, 45 did not pay overtime costs to its employees.  Another 23 suppliers were paying below the minimum wage.

On January 15, 2009 at 8:45 to 9 am about 2000 factory workers gathered at the company and began destroying the factory properties.  The workers also blocked a road and threw stones at the police.

References

Suzhou Workers Riot, 2010
Riots and civil disorder in China
Suzhou workers riot
History of Suzhou
Suzhou Industrial Park